Francis Valentino (born May 30, 1988 in Long Branch, NJ ) is an American drummer who performs, records and tours nationally & internationally with a variety of artists.

Music career
In 2006, Valentino joined New Jersey rock band Outside the Box which achieved local and regional notoriety by performing with or opening for many national acts. Outside the Box was named the house band at The Stone Pony club in Asbury Park, NJ from 2010 to 2013. Outside The Box released one full-length album entitled "Bridge" which was produced by Jeff Kazee. Outside the Box disbanded in 2013.

In 2013, Valentino joined Reno, NV-based American Country band Hellbound Glory for Kid Rock's Rebel Soul Tour, which visited 28 U.S. cities. The tour featured Kid Rock, Buckcherry and Hellbound Glory. Subsequent touring with Hellbound Glory included dates with ZZ Top, 10 Years (band), Hinder and The Supersuckers. Francis toured with Hellbound Glory until 2015.

As of February 2015, Valentino has been touring with Bloomington, IL-based guitarist/ songwriter Matthew Curry. Tours have included dates with The Doobie Brothers' The Steve Miller Band and Peter Frampton

In 2020, Valentino toured with David Lee Roth on KISS' End of the Road World Tour.

Recording
2022 Don't Be a Stranger - Matthew Curry

2022 Ain't Talkin' Bout Love (re-recording) - David Lee Roth

2021 Camino - Riley Owens

2020 Ruminations From Barrydise During An Apocalypse - Rick Barry

2020 Dark Hour - Billy Walton Band

2019 Open Road - Matthew Curry

2016 Shine On - Matthew Curry

2016 American Casino - American Casino

2016 3 Country Classics (Singles) - Hellbound Glory

2015 The Black Mass - Hellbound Glory

2015 Transmission Party - Transmission Party

2013 Live From Nashville (Recorded at Bridgestone Arena) - Hellbound Glory

2013 The Feud (Single) - Hellbound Glory

2013 Songs From The Barn - Southside Johnny & The Poor Fools

2012 Men Without Women Live (Recorded at The Stone Pony. Asbury Park, NJ) - Southside Johnny and The Asbury Jukes (percussion)

2012 The Year Of Living Dangerously - Swindling Gypsies

2011 Bridge - Outside The Box

Tours & Performing

2020 KISS End of the Road World Tour - David Lee Roth

2019 BWB European Tour - Billy Walton Band

2016/2017/2018 Shine On Tour - Matthew Curry

2015 Steve Miller Band 2015 Spring Tour - Matthew Curry

2015 Doobie Brothers' Listen To The Music Tour - Matthew Curry

2015 Blackberry Smoke Holding All The Roses Tour - Leon Virgil Bowers

2014 The Way Back Home Tour - Hellbound Glory

2014 10 Years Unplugged Tour - Hellbound Glory

2013 Supersuckers Tour - Hellbound Glory

2013 Hustle To Get By Tour - Hellbound Glory

2013 Kid Rock Rebel Soul Tour - Hellbound Glory

2012 European Tour - Outside The Box

References
http://nj1015.com/does-this-jersey-shore-band-have-the-coolest-tour-bus-of-all-time-poll/
http://www.songkick.com/concerts/14797504-kid-rock-at-bridgestone-arena
http://www.thepoorfools.com/music

American drummers
1988 births
People from New Jersey
Living people
21st-century American drummers